Apatelopteryx deceptrix is a moth of the family of Lasiocampidae. It is found in Madagascar.

The wingspan of this moth is 46 mm.

References

Lasiocampidae
Moths described in 1914
Moths of Madagascar
Moths of Africa